The Faerie Path is the first novel in a six-book series by the British author Frewin Jones.  The story follows Anita Palmer, a teenager from two different parallel universes, and her struggle to maintain both lives.

Plot
On the eve of her sixteenth birthday, Anita has an accident and ends up in hospital with her boyfriend Evan. To brighten her mood, at midnight her parents give her one of her presents, one sent to her by mail with no return address: it is a beautiful book, but the pages are blank.

Anita explores the book, which suddenly has a story written inside. It tells about a lost princess, the seventh of seven daughters, who has become trapped in the Mortal World on her sixteenth birthday, the night before she was to marry Lord Gabriel Drake. Suddenly Anita grows wings and she flies out of the window, above London. Suddenly, her wings wither away and she falls.  Found in the hospital bathroom by a nurse, she is returned to her bed, still worried about Evan not waking. The nurse brings Anita a gift addressed to her, from Evan's belongings.  The gift is a necklace that she quickly puts around her neck. She fell asleep, and when she woke up, Evan is gone. A ghostly image appears to Anita, the image of Gabriel Drake, calling her to follow him. Anita followed Lord Drake out onto a balcony where he urges her to focus strongly on him so that she can reach him. Anita tries her hardest to focus on him and suddenly their hands meet in the air. Lord Drake pulls Anita from the Mortal realm presents her to her father: as it turns out, Anita is also Tania, the seventh child of Oberon and Titania, king and queen of fairyland.

Children of Oberon and Titania
Eden - Eden is the eldest child. Like her father, she is able to wield the power of the Mystic Arts. She is married to Lord Valentine, prior to the first book. Her favorite color was never revealed, nor what her bedroom was adorned with. She once had black hair but during her 500 year solitude, it turned white as snow. Her eyes are blue.

Hopie - Hope is the second eldest child. Her power is the ability to heal. She is married to Lord Brython prior to the first book. Her favorite color is brown, as is the color of her hair and eyes, and her bedroom is adorned with dark woodland plants and trees.

Sancha - Sancha is the 3rd born. Her power is the ability to move objects without touching them and the ability to read anything instantly with a simple touch. She is unmarried. Her favorite color is black. Her bedroom is adorned with unending words and stories. Her hair is dark brown and her eyes are a deep blue

Cordelia - Cordelia is the 4th born and middle child. Her power is the ability to communicate with all animals. In book 4, she married Lord Bryn. Her favorite color is green and her bedroom is adorned with various wildlife. Her eyes are green and her hair is a light ginger-gold.

Zara - Zara was the 5th born and third youngest child. Her power was the ability to weave enchantments into her music. She was killed in book 3 by Lord Gabriel Drake and would later become the Dream Weaver posthumously. She did not have a love interest. Her favorite color was blue. Her bedroom was adorned with crashing waves. Her hair was blonde and her eyes were a bright blue.

Rathina - Rathina is the 6th born and second youngest child. Her ability is the ability to wield Isenmort (metal) with no ill effects. She was the secondary antagonist if books 1-3 due to her love for the main antagonist, Lord, Gabriel Drake. Her favorite color is red. Her bedroom is adorned with tireless dancers. Her hair is deep black and eyes that are deep blue.

Tania - Tania is the 7th born and youngest child. Her power is the ability to walk between the realms of Faerie and the Mortal world. She is the main protagonist of the book. Her favorite color is purple. Her romantic interest is Edric Chanticlear. Her bedroom is adorned with mountain scenes and wildlife. She looks exactly like her mother; red hair and green eyes.

Reception
The Faerie Path was viewed as a "floral Faerie tale may unspool at a measured pace, but girls will likely take to Anita. ... A well-executed reference to Romeo and Juliet gives the finale a bit more punch than most fantasy romances" and a "well-paced style that will communicate with today’s readers."  It was rated as a book with good Christian values by Squeaky Clean Reviews who also found the "revelation of the villains horribly predictable."  It was recommended for readers who enjoy romance and adventure.

References

External links 
 

2007 fantasy novels
British fantasy novels
British young adult novels
Contemporary fantasy novels
HarperCollins books